Robert Lubig (born September 17, 1955, in Rotterdam, Netherlands) is a former Canadian Football League offensive lineman who played nine seasons in the CFL.

References

Career stats

1955 births
Living people
Dutch players of Canadian football
Canadian people of Dutch descent
Canadian football offensive linemen
Calgary Stampeders players
Toronto Argonauts players
Montreal Alouettes players
Montana State Bobcats football players
Canadian players of American football